Mitchell Symons (born 11 February 1957) is a British journalist and writer. Born in London, he was educated at Mill Hill School and the LSE where he studied Law. Since leaving the BBC, where he was a researcher and director, he has worked as a writer, broadcaster and journalist. He was a principal writer for the early UK editions of the board game Trivial Pursuit, and has devised many television formats. He wrote an award-winning opinion column for the Daily Express.

Awards 
 2010 Blue Peter Book Awards Best Book with Facts, Why Eating Bogeys Is Good For You
 2011 Blue Peter Book Awards Best Book with Facts, Do Igloos Have Loos?

Published books

Fiction
 All In
 The Lot
 No Red Light Shining

Non-fiction
Why Girls Can't Throw (and Other Questions You Always Wanted Answered)
That Book
This Book of More Perfectly Useless Information
The Other Book of the Most Perfectly Useless Information
This, That and the Other (Compilation of That Book, This Book and the Other Book).  Later re-released as The Ultimate Loo Book
Forfeit!
The Equation Book of Sports Crosswords
The Equation Book of Movie Crosswords
The You Magazine Book Of Journalists (four books, co-author)
Movielists (co-author)
The Sunday Magazine Book Of Crosswords
The Hello! Magazine Book Of Crosswords (three books)
How To Be Fat: The Chip and Fry Diet (co-author)
The Book of Criminal Records
The Book of Lists
The Book of Celebrity Lists
The Book of Celebrity Sex Lists
National Lottery Big Draw 2000 (co-author)
How to Avoid a Wombat's Bum
The Sudoku Institute Book
How To Speak Celebrity
Where Do Nudists Keep Their Hankies?
Why Eating Bogeys Is Good For You
Don't Get Me Started: A Way-Beyond-Grumpy Rant About Modern Life
How Much Poo Does An Elephant Do?
Why Do Farts Smell Like Rotten Eggs?
Why Does Ear Wax Taste So Gross?
Mitchell Symons Diary 2010
Why You Need A Passport When You're Going To Puke
Do Igloos Have Loos?
On Your Farts, Get Set, Go!
Don't Wipe Your Bum With A Hedgehog
The Book of Poker Calls (co-author)
Desert Island Discs: Flotsam & Jetsam
The Bumper Book For The Loo
Why Spacemen Can't Burp
Numberland
Happily Never After: Modern Cautionary Tales
Why Don't You Smell When You're Sleeping?
There Are Tittles In This Title
The World In Numbers Calendar 2017
The World In Numbers Calendar 2018
The YOU Magazine Book of General Knowledge Crosswords

References

External links
  

1957 births
British children's writers
British male journalists
Children's non-fiction writers
Alumni of the London School of Economics
People educated at Mill Hill School
People from Edgware
English atheists
Secular Jews
Living people